Mother of Pearl and Silver: The Andalusian is a painting by James McNeill Whistler. The work shows a woman in full figure standing with her back to the viewer, with her head in profile. The model is Ethel Whibley, (née Birnie Philip) the artist's secretary and sister-in-law.

The colour scheme of the painting is black, mother of pearl and silver. The title refers to Ethel's grey silk evening dress, which is a Parisian dress in a Belle Époque style, with the transparent layered sleeves of the black bolero jacket resembling a traditional Andalusian costume.

Artist and model
James McNeill Whistler was born in the United States in 1834, the son of George Washington Whistler, a railway engineer. In 1843, his father relocated the family to Saint Petersburg, Russia, where James received training in painting. After a stay in England, he returned to America to attend the US Military Academy at West Point in 1851. In 1855, he made his way back to Europe, determined to dedicate himself to painting. He settled in Paris at first, but in 1859 moved to London, where he would spend most of the remainder of his life. Although he returned to Paris from 1892 to 1901 and resided at 110 Rue du Bac, Paris, with his studio at the top of 86 Rue Notre Dame des Champs.

Ethel Birnie Philip was born at Chelsea, London, on 29 September 1861. She was the daughter of the sculptor John Birnie Philip and Frances Black. Her sister Beatrice (also called "Beatrix" or "Trixie') married Whistler in 1888. Ethel worked for a time in 1893–1894 as secretary to Whistler. She married Charles Whibley in 1896 in the garden of the house occupied by Whistler at Rue du Bac. Her sister Rosalind Birnie Philip succeeded Ethel as Whistler's secretary, and was appointed the artist's executrix at his death.

Whistler painted a number of full-length portraits of Ethel, including Mother of Pearl and Silver: The Andalusian and the watercolour Rose and Silver: Portrait of Mrs Whibley; and other sketches and etchings of her titled as Miss Ethel Philip or Mrs Whibley.

Creation
Whistler commenced work on The Andalusian in London in 1888, the year Whistler married Beatrix, with the painting being completed in Paris in 1900.

References

Sources

External links
 at the National Gallery of Art

1900 paintings
Collections of the National Gallery of Art
Paintings by James Abbott McNeill Whistler
19th-century portraits
Portraits of women
Belle Époque